Ibesikpo-Asutan is a Local Government Area of Akwa Ibom State,  Nigeria. It is inhabited by the Ibesikpo and Asutan clans. The Local Government Headquarters is Nung Udoe. It is the home of former Akwa Ibom State governor architect Obong Victor Attah.
It is also Home to the one Time Chief of Air staff, Late Air Marshall Nsikak Eduok.
It is made up of 43 villages.
The Lutheran Church National Headquarters, Seminary, and Lutheran High school are located in the Local Government, at Obot Idim.

References

Local Government Areas in Akwa Ibom State